Philippa "Pip" Tomson (born 30 August 1977) is an English journalist and presenter. She is a news correspondent for Good Morning Britain on ITV Breakfast.

Career
At the age of 18 she trained as a journalist and later became the chief reporter for the Express & Star in Wolverhampton.

In March 2002 she joined ITV News Central on ITV Central – newsreading bulletins, co-presenting alongside Bob Warman and reporting in the West Midlands region. In addition, she worked as a freelancer with Central Extra on ITV Central, ITV News London on ITV London, the ITV News Channel and Westcountry Live on ITV Westcountry.

On 25 September 2006, she became a co-presenter of ITV News Tyne Tees on ITV Tyne Tees. On 2 February 2009 she was redeployed as the weather presenter and a fill-in presenter of ITV News Tyne Tees and Lookaround for ITV Tyne Tees & Border.

From August 2008 until July 2011, she was an occasional co-presenter of Tony Horne in the Morning on Metro Radio. In April 2009, she guest co-presented on Real Radio North East alongside former ITV Tyne Tees colleague Jonathan Morrell.

From February 2009 until August 2011, she was a columnist for the Sunday Sun. She has worked as a features writer for the Daily Mail.

In November and December 2009, Tomson appeared as a weather presenter for GMTV, and on 29 December 2010 for Daybreak on ITV Breakfast.

On 1 May 2012 she joined Sky News as a freelance news presenter and reporter.

In 2013, she returned to Daybreak (now Good Morning Britain) where she is a news correspondent. For a time she was also a reporter for ITV News London.

On 14 June 2022 she was the news presenter on Good Morning Britain from the main studio covering for Charlotte Hawkins.

Awards
Presenter of the Year, Royal Television Society North East and the Border (2010 and 2012).

Charity interests
Tomson is a member of the Cash for Kids charity. She was also the 2008 vice-president for the Tsunami Fund Raising charity, when she helped to raise money for students at the Ban Kamala School, devastated by the 2004 Indian Ocean tsunami.

She is a patron of Someone Cares and in 2009 took part in the Great North Run to raise funds and awareness for the charity. In 2010 she ran the event for Brysons Animal Refuge and Ark on the Edge animal sanctuary, while in 2012 she ran again in aid of Ark on the Edge and also the Children's Heart Unit at the Freeman Hospital in Newcastle upon Tyne.

References

External links

Living people
People from York
English television journalists
English women journalists
English television presenters
English television producers
English radio personalities
ITV regional newsreaders and journalists
ITN newsreaders and journalists
ITV Weather
Sky News newsreaders and journalists
1977 births
British women television journalists
British women television producers
British television producers
Journalists from Yorkshire